Big Jim may refer to:

People

Nickname
 James Clark (shinty) (born 1973), Scottish shinty player
 Jim Clinton (1850–1921), American Major League Baseball player
 James Colosimo (1878–1920), Italian-American Mafia crime boss
 Jim Courtright (gunman) (1848–1887), American lawman and murderer
 Jim Crockett (1909–1973), American professional wrestling promoter and sports franchise owner
 Jim Daniell (1918–1983), American National Football League player
 Giacomo Ferri (born 1959), Italian football manager and former player
 James Fisk (financier) (1835–1872), American stockbroker, corporate executive and "robber baron"
 Jim Folsom (1908–1987), American politician, twice governor of Alabama
 Jim French (cowboy), key participant in the 1878 Lincoln County Wars
 Jim Fridley (1924–2003), American Major League Baseball player
 Jim Hamilton (rugby union) (born 1982), Scottish rugby union footballer
 Jim Healy (trade unionist) (1898–1961), Australian trade unionist and communist activist
 Jim Hogg (1851–1906), American lawyer and politician, 20th governor of Texas
Jim Justice (born 1951), American businessman and politician, 36th governor of West Virginia
 James Larkin (1876–1947), Irish trade union leader and socialist activist
 Jim McCafferty (1916–2006), American college basketball coach
 Jim Mills (rugby league) (born 1944), Welsh rugby union and rugby league footballer
 Jim Nance (1942–1992), American college and pro football player
 James Patrick O'Leary (1869–1925), Chicago gambling boss and saloon owner
 James Pendergast (1856–1911), American politician, first political boss of Kansas City
 Jim Ricca (1927–2007), American National Football League player
 Jim Rivera (1921–2017), American Major League Baseball player
 Jim Roberts (baseball) (1895–1984), American Major League Baseball pitcher
 James Roberts (trade unionist) (1878–1967), New Zealand trade unionist and president of the Labour Party
 Jim Robinson (trombonist) (1892–1976), American jazz musician
 Jim Schrader (1932–1972), American National Football League player
 Jim Smith (cricketer, born 1906) (1906–1979), English cricketer
 James R. Thompson (born 1936), American politician, longtime governor of Illinois
 Jim Thompson (writer) (1906–1977), American author and screenwriter
 Jim Tatum (1913–1959), American college football and baseball player and coach
 Jim Tinndahn (born 1961), Danish mobster
 Jim Tucker (journalist) (1934–2013), American journalist
 Jim Weaver (right-handed pitcher) (1903–1983), American Major League Baseball pitcher
 Jim West (boxer) (1954–2015), Australian boxer
 Jim Williams (powerlifter) (1940–2007), American powerlifter
 James "Big Jim" Wright (1966–2018), American musician

Native Americans
 Big Jim, grandson of Tecumseh and chief of the Kispicotha or Absentee Shawnee band – see Mardock Mission

Ring name or stage name
 James Harris (1950–2020), American professional wrestler under the ring names Kamala (wrestler) and Big Jim Harris
 Jim Martin (musician) (born 1961), American rock guitarist
 Big Jim Sullivan (1941–2012), English guitarist born James George Tomkins
 Jimmy Valiant (born 1942), semi-retired professional wrestler and author born James Harold Fanning

Characters
 "Big Jim" Walker, title character of the Jim Croce song "You Don't Mess Around with Jim"
 Big Jim, a character in the Bob Dylan song "Lily, Rosemary and the Jack of Hearts"
 Big Jim, in the song of the same name by Emerson, Lake & Palmer
 Title character of the film Big Jim McLain, played by John Wayne
 "Big Jim" Colfax, a villain in the 1946 film The Killers
 Big Jim McKay, in the Charlie Chaplin film The Gold Rush, played by Mack Swain
 "Big Jim" Devine, a major character in the Australian crime drama television series Underbelly: Razor
 James "Big Jim" Rennie, a major character in the Stephen King novel Under the Dome and the television series based on it
 James R. "Big Jim" Smoke, Copperhead antagonist and would-be assassin of President Lincoln in Peter G. Tsouras' The Britannia's Fist Trilogy

Other uses
 Big Jim (toy line), a Mattel action figure line
 Big Jim Mountain, part of the Chiwaukum Mountains in Washington state, United States
 James T. Staples, a 1908 American sternwheel steamboat also known as the Big Jim
 KJRV ("Big Jim 93.3"), a radio station licensed to serve Wessington Springs, South Dakota
 Big Jim pepper, a variety of New Mexico chile pepper

See also
 Jim Folsom Jr. (born 1949), American politician, nicknamed "Little Jim" to distinguish him from his father, "Big Jim" Folsom (see above)

Lists of people by nickname